The Dublin International Film Festival (DIFF) is an annual film festival held in Dublin, Ireland, since 2003.

History
Dublin International Film Festival was established in 2003. It was revived by Michael Dwyer, international film critic and The Irish Times Chief Film Correspondent, along with David McLoughlin, film producer. The duo had started the initial Dublin film Festival in the 1980s when Mc Loughlin was still an undergraduate in Trinity College Dublin. The festival was established to present an opportunity for Dublin's cinema-going audiences to experience the best in Irish and international cinema.

"Dublin has remarkable film attendance per capita, among the highest in Europe, certainly the highest in the EU," Dwyer said in a 2003 interview. "It seems absurd that the city didn't have an international film festival."

The festival secured €25,000 in funding from the Arts Council of Ireland for planning purposes the first year which has since increased to over €100,000. Jameson Irish Whiskey was the title sponsor of the festival providing significant support for many years and backing the festival with a major marketing campaign; it was called the Jameson Dublin International Film Festival (JDIFF). The festival was also supported by a number of significant partners including The Irish Times, FM104, Conrad Hotel, Cineworld, McConnells, MSL Mercedes-Benz, Windmill Lane and Cine Electric. Other funders include The Irish Film Board, Dublin City Council, Fáilte Ireland and a number of Cultural Institutions including the Goethe-Institut.

In 2007, the festival introduced a career achievement award, the Volta Award, to celebrate individuals who have made a significant contribution to the world of film. In the same year the festival also introduced the Audience Award recipients of which include Once and the surfing documentary Waveriders.

Festival venues include the Screen Cinema, Hawkins Street; Cineworld, Parnell Street; the Savoy Cinema, O'Connell Street and the Irish Film Institute, Eustace Street. In 2008 Movies@Dundrum was used as a venue. In 2009 the Light House Cinema, Smithfield was added as a venue.

2008 saw a significant change to the festival's executive with Gráinne Humphreys replacing Michael Dwyer as Festival Director and Joanne O'Hagan assuming the role, formerly held by Rory Concannon, of chief executive officer. Michael Dwyer assumed the position of Chairman of the Dublin International Film Festival Board with David McLoughlin stepping down.

Over 38,000 admissions were recorded for the 2008 festival for ticketed events. Non ticketed events include a citywide installation Dublin on Screen to celebrate Dublin's cinematic heritage. The initiative featured films shot on location in Dublin and screened on the very spot that they were shot on.

The festival has come to be regarded as an important event for the cinema of Ireland, bringing together film-makers, actors, producers and other celebrities from Ireland and around the world. The festival continues to be committed to supporting film and in 2008 initiated a significant International Screen Writing Award, Write Here, Write Now. The winner of the award was announced at the 2009 festival which took place from 12 – 22 February 2009.

In 2016, the original sponsors, Jameson, were replaced by Audi after thirteen years of sponsorship. The festival was then called the Audi Dublin International Film Festival (ADIFF) and the new sponsorship deal lasted three years.

In 2018, Virgin Media Ireland committed to sponsoring the festival for three years, starting in 2019, and it was called the Virgin Media Dublin International Film Festival (VMDIFF) . Since 2022 the festival has had no name sponsor.

Awards 
The festival introduced the Volta Awards in 2007. The award is named after Dublin's first cinema, the Volta Picture Theatre, established by author James Joyce in 1905. Awards are given for career achievement and audience favourite. Critics' awards were first presented in 2009. The Michael Dwyer Discovery Award was created in 2010 after his death to honour Irish people working in film.

 2007 
 Career Achievement Awards:
 Gabriel Byrne, actor
 Brendan McCaul, film producer and distributor
 Jeremy Thomas, producer
 Consolata Boyle, costume designer
 Audience Award: Once

 2008 
The 2008 festival was held from 15 to 24 February 2008.

 Career Achievement Awards:
 Brendan Gleeson, actor
 Daniel Day-Lewis, actor
 Leo Ward, cinema chain owner
 Audience Award: Waveriders

2009
 Career Achievement Awards:
Paolo Sorrentino, director
 George Morrison, documentary maker
 Thierry Frémaux, artistic director of the Cannes Film Festival
 Audience Award: Anvil! The Story of Anvil
 Critics' Awards:
 Best Film: Let the Right One In
 Best Irish Film: The Secret of Kells (a joint Irish-Belgian-French production)
 Best Documentary: Anvil! The Story of Anvil
 Best Director: Paolo Sorrentino (Il Divo)
 Best Actor: Tom Hardy (Bronson)

2010
The 2010 festival was held from 18 to 28 February 2010.

Career Achievement Awards:
 Ciarán Hinds, actor
 Patricia Clarkson, actress
 Kristin Scott Thomas, actress

Audience Award: His & Hers

Dublin Film Critics Circle Awards:
 Best Film: Samson and Delilah
 Best Irish Film: The Fading Light
 Best Male Performance: Patrick O'Donnell (The Fading Light)
 Best Female Performance: Tilda Swinton (I Am Love)
 Best Director: Yorgos Lanthimos (Dogtooth)
 Best Documentary: His & Hers
 Special Jury Prize: Bad Lieutenant: Port of Call New Orleans
 Michael Dwyer Discovery Award: Kate McCullough, cinematographer (His and Hers)

2011
The 2011 festival was held from 17 to 27 February 2011.

Career Achievement Awards:
 Martin Sheen, actor
 Kevin Brownlow, film historian and preservationist
 François Ozon, director

Audience Award: Benda Bilili!

Dublin Film Critics Circle Awards:
 Best Film: The Robber
 Best Irish Film: Snap
 Best Director: Alexei Popogrebski (How I Ended This Summer)
 Best Irish Director: Carmel Winters (Snap)
 Best Cinematography: Tim Fleming (As If I Am Not There)
 Best Screenplay: Tudor Voican (Medal of Honor)
 Best Short: Small Change
 Best International Documentary: Cave of Forgotten Dreams
 Best Irish Documentary: Men of Arlington
 Best Début: Philip Koch (Picco)
 Best Actor: Jakob Cedergren (Submarino)
 Best Actress: Martina Gusman (Carancho)
 Special Jury Prize: The Four Times
 Michael Dwyer Discovery Award: Still Films

2012
Volta Awards:
 Stellan Skarsgård, actor
 Marin Karmitz, director, producer, distributor and cinema chain owner
 Al Pacino, actor

Audience Award: The Raid: Redemption

Dublin Film Critics Circle Awards:
 Best Film: The Raid: Redemption
 Best Irish Film: Nuala: A Life and Death
 Best Actor: Michael Fuith (Michael)
 Best Actress: Greta Gerwig (Damsels in Distress)
 Best Screenplay: Joseph Cedar (Footnote)
 Best Director: Nuri Bilge Ceylan (Once Upon a Time in Anatolia)
 Best Documentary: Samsara
 Michael Dwyer Discovery Award: Eoghan Mac Giolla Bhríde for Silence

2013
The 2013 festival ran from 14 to 24 February.

Volta Career Achievement Awards:
 Danny DeVito, actor and director
 Tim Roth, actor
 Costa-Gavras, director
 Joss Whedon, screenwriter and director

The Dublin Film Critics Circle selected the following winners:

 Best Film: Vanishing Waves by Kristina Buožytė
 Best Director: Mikhail Segal for Short Stories
 Best Actor: Aleksey Vertkov for White Tiger
 Best Actress: Dilan Aksüt, Night of Silence
 Best Debut: Maja Miloš for Klip
 Best Screenplay: Oriol Paulo and Lara Sendim for The Body
 Best Cinematography: Oleg Mutu for Beyond the Hills
 Best Documentary: Far Out Isn't Far Enough: The Tomi Ungerer Story
 Best Irish Feature: Babygirl by Macdara Vallelly
 Best Irish Documentary: Get the Picture by Cathy Pearson
 Michael Dwyer Discovery Award: Broken Song by Claire DixAudience Award: Broken Song

Jury Prizes were awarded to:
 Blancanieves
 After Lucia
 The King of Pigs

2014
The 2014 festival ran from 13 to 23 February.

Volta Career Achievement Awards:
 Terry Gilliam, actor and director
 Peter Morgan, screenwriter
 Richard Dreyfuss, actor
 Stanley Tucci, actor

The Dublin Film Critics Circle selected the following winners:

 Best Film: The Reunion by Anna Odell
 Best Director: Paweł Pawlikowski for Ida
 Best Actor: Jack O'Connell for Starred Up
 Best Actress: Mira Barkhammar, Mira Grosin and Liv LeMoyne for We Are the Best!
 Best Debut Feature: The Rocket by Kim Mordaunt
 Best Screenplay: Georg Mass for Two Lives
 Best Cinematography: Daniel Landin for Under the Skin
 Best Documentary: Los Wild Ones by Elise Salomon
 Best Irish Feature: Love Eternal by Brendan Muldowney
 Best Irish Documentary: Living in a Coded Land by Pat Collins
 Michael Dwyer Discovery Award: Out of Here by Donal ForemanAudience Award: Los Wild Ones

Jury Prizes were awarded to:
 Blue Ruin
 The Golden Dream
 The Congress

2015
The 2015 festival ran from 19 to 29 March.

Volta Career Achievement Awards:
 Kenneth Branagh, actor and director
 Laurent Cantet, director and screenwriter
 Julie Andrews, actress

The Dublin Film Critics Circle selected the following winners:

 Best Film: The Tribe, director Myroslav Slaboshpytskiy
 Best Director: Ruben Östlund for Force Majeure
 Best Screenplay: Yuri Bykov for The Fool
 Best Cinematography: Lyle Vincent for A Girl Walks Home Alone at Night
 Best Documentary: Kurt Cobain: Montage of Heck, director Brett Morgen
 Best Actor: Cliff Curtis for The Dark Horse
 Best Actress: Nina Hoss for Phoenix
 Best Irish Feature: Glassland, director Gerard Barrett
 Best Irish Documentary: Wheel of Fortune: The Story and Legacy of the Fairview Lion Tamer, director Joe Lee
 Best Debut: Chaitanya Tamhane for Court
 Michael Dwyer Discovery Award: Piers McGrail, cinematographer on Glassland, Let Us Prey, The Canal

Audience Awards went to:
 Feature: The Salt of the Earth
 Short: Boogaloo and Graham

Special Jury Prizes were awarded to:
 A Pigeon Sat on a Branch Reflecting on Existence
 Eden
 You're Sleeping, Nicole
 10,000 km

2016

The 2016 festival ran from 18 to 28 February.

Volta Career Achievement Awards:
 Angela Lansbury, actress and singer
 Claudia Cardinale, actress
 Andrew Stanton, director, screenwriter, producer and voice actor

The Dublin Film Critics Circle selected the following winners:

 Best Film: Mustang, director Deniz Gamze Ergüven
 Best Director: Lucile Hadžihalilović for Evolution
 Best Screenplay: Jaco Van Dormael and Thomas Gunzig for The Brand New Testament
 Best Cinematography: Mátyás Erdély for Son of Saul
 Best Documentary: Heart of a Dog, director Laurie Anderson
 Best Actor: Alex Lawther for Departure
 Best Actress: Monica Bellucci for Ville-Marie
 Best Ensemble Cast: Green Room, director Jeremy Saulnier
 Best Irish Feature: Viva, director Paddy Breathnach
 Best Irish Documentary: Atlantic, director Risteard Ó Domhnaill
 Best Irish Short Film: Geist, director Eric Daniel Dunn
 Best International Short Film: The Bathtub, director Tim Ellrich
 George Byrne Maverick Award: Stephen Rea for Viva
 Michael Dwyer Discovery Award: Ferdia Walsh-Peelo, actor on Sing Street

AUDI-ence Awards went to:
 Feature: Viva
 Short: Little Bear

Special Jury Prizes were awarded to:
 Black Mountain Poets
 Victoria
 Anomalisa

ADIFF Discovery Awards went to:
 Barry Keoghan, actor on Mammal, Traders and The Break
 Jack O'Shea, director/animator on A Coat Made Dark and Eat the Danger
 Kathryn Kennedy, producer on My Name is Emily, It's Not Yet Dark and After

2017
The festival ran from 16 to 26 February.

Volta Career Achievement Awards:

 Vanessa Redgrave, actress

The Dublin Film Critics' Circle selected the following winners:

 Best Film – Aquarius, director Kleber Mendonça Filho
 Best Actress – Florence Pugh, Lady Macbeth
 Best Actor – Sherwan Haji, The Other Side of Hope
 Best Director – Lav Diaz, The Woman Who Left
 Best Cinematography – M. David Mullen, The Love Witch
 Best Screenplay – Kristina Grozeva, Petar Valchanov, Glory
 Best Irish Feature – Handsome Devil, director John Butler
 Best Irish Documentary – The Farthest, director Emer Reynolds
 Best Documentary – I Am Not Your Negro, director Raoul Peck
 George Byrne Maverick Award: Emer Reynolds, editor

Special Jury Prizes were awarded to:

 Kristopher Avedisian, Donald Cried
 Daouda Coulibaly, Wulu
 My Life as a Courgette
 The Transfiguration

AUDI-ence Award:
 The Farthest, director Emer Reynolds

ADIFF Discovery Awards went to:
 John Connors, actor on The Secret Scripture and Breathe
 Niamh Algar, actor on Without Name, Pebbles and Gone
 Vincent Gallagher, writer/director on Second to None and Love is a Sting

2018
The festival began on 22 February. Its ending was extended to 12 March due to the "Beast from the East" snowstorm.

Volta Career Achievement Award:

 Paul Schrader, writer and director
 Vanessa Redgrave (missed 2017 ceremony due to illness)

The Dublin Film Critics Circle selected the following winners:

 Best Film: Custody, director Xavier Legrand
 Best Director: Chloé Zhao for The Rider
 Best Irish Director: Rebecca Daly for Good Favour
 Best Screenplay: Lynne Ramsay for You Were Never Really Here
 Best Cinematography: Monika Lenczewska for Under the Tree
 Best Actor: Charlie Plummer for Lean on Pete
 Best Actress: Charlotte Rampling for Hannah
 Best Documentary: So Help Me God (Ni juge, ni soumise), director Yves Hinant
 Best Irish Film: The Lonely Battle of Thomas Reid, director Feargal Ward
 Michael Dwyer Discovery Award: Coralie Fargeat, director-writer on Revenge
 George Byrne Maverick Award: Stephen Rea, actor in Black 47Extraordinary Achievement: Bill Morrison, writer-director-editor of Dawson City: Frozen Time

Jury Prizes were awarded to:
 Kathleen Hepburn for Never Steady, Never Still
 Warwick Thornton for Sweet Country
 Liu Jian for Have a Nice Day
 Ryan Killackey for Yasuni Man

ADIFF Discovery Awards went to:
 Mia Mullarkey, director of Mother & Baby
 Rua Meegan and Trevor Whelan, directors of Bordalo II: A Life of Waste
 TJ O'Grady Peyton, director of Wave
 Special Mention: Jessie Buckley

Short film awards:
 Best Irish Short Film: Mother & Baby, director Mia Mullarkey
 Special Mention: Time Traveller, director Steve Kenny
 Best International Short Film: Retouch, director Kaveh Mazaheri
 Special Mention: Mary Mother, director Sadam Wahidi

AUDI-ence Awards went to:
 Feature: The Breadwinner
 Short: Time Traveller

Fantastic Flix Children's Jury Awards
 Feature: Room 213
 Short: Earthy Encounters

2019
Virgin Media Ireland was the sponsor for the 2019 festival, which was held 20 February – 3 March.

Volta Awards:
 Ralph Fiennes, actor-director 
 Sean Bailey, producer

Short film awards:
 Best Irish Short Film: Five Letters to the Stranger Who Will Dissect My Brain, director Oonagh Kearney
 Special Mention: The First was a Boy, director Shaun Dunne
 Best International Short Film: Inanimate, director Lucia BulgheroniSpecial Mention: Child, director Joren Molter

Audience Awards went to:
 Feature: Maiden, director Alex Holmes
 Short: 99 Problems, director Ross Killeen

Discovery Awards went to:
 Alexandra McGuinness, writer-director of She's Missing
 Ian Hunt Duffy, director of Low Tide
 Oonagh Kearney, director of Five Letters to the Stranger Who Will Dissect My Brain
Madonna Bambino, makeup artist on Low Tide

Virgin Media Dublin International Film Festival Documentary prize:
Winner: Of Fathers and Sons, director Talal Derki
Honourable mention: GAZA, directors Garry Keane and Andrew McConnell

Dublin Human Rights Film Award:
Winner: Heartbound: A Different Kind of Love Story, director Janus Metz Pedersen
Special mention: Land Without God, directors Gerard Mannix Flynn, Maedhbh McMahon and Lotta Petronella

Children's Jury Awards:
Feature – Winner: Mia and the White Lion, director Gilles de Maistre
Feature – Special Mention: Departures, director Peter Hutchings
Short – Winner: First Disco, director Helen M. O'Reilly
Feature – Special Mention: The Overcoat, directors Meelis Arulepp and Sean Mullen

Young Programmer's Choice Award:
Winner: Rafiki, director Wanuri Kahiu
 Special Mention: Ballon, director Michael Herbig

The Dublin Film Critics Circle selected the following winners:

 Best Film: Transit, director Christian Petzold
 Best Director: Rima Das for Bulbul Can Sing
 Best Cinematography: Hiroshi Okuyama for Jesus
 Best Documentary: GAZA, directors Garry Keane and Andrew McConnell
 Best Irish Film: Greta, director Neil Jordan
 Best Screenplay: Bai Xue for The Crossing
 Best Actor: Bogdan Dumitrache for Pororoca
 Best Actress: Jessie Buckley for Wild RoseJury Prizes Jia Zhangke, director of Ash Is Purest White
 Alex Ross Perry, writer-director-producer of Her Smell
 Baran Kosari, actress in Cold Sweat (La Permission)
Hu Bo, director-writer-editor of An Elephant Sitting Still
Bo Burnham, writer-director of Eighth Grade
 George Byrne Maverick Award: Hugh O'Conor, director of Metal Heart
 Michael Dwyer Discovery Award:''' Dianne Lucille Campbell, director of El Hor2020
The 2020 festival took place between 26 February and 8 March.

Volta Awards:
Charlie Kaufman, writer and director
Trine Dyrholm, actress and singer

Audience Awards:
Virgin Media Audience Award: Endless Sunshine on a Cloudy Day (dir. John Connors)
Virgin Media Audience Award, Short Film: Iarscoláire (dir. Shaun Dunne)
Fantastic Flix Audience Award: OnwardFantastic Flix Audience Award, Short Film: The Girl at the End of the GardenAer Lingus Discovery Awards:
Paddy Slattery, writer/director of Broken LawCara Holmes, director of Welcome to a Bright White LimboClaire Byrne, director of Sister ThisDónall Ó Héalaí, actor in ArrachtDocumentary Competition:
Special mention: Women Make Film: A New Road Trip Through CinemaWinner: Confucian Dream, director Mijie Li

Short Film Awards, supported by Griffith College:

Special Mention International Short Film: AdnanBest International Short Film: Quiet Land Good PeopleSpecial Mention, Irish Short Film : Innocent Boy, dir. John Connors 
Best Irish Short Film: Welcome to a Bright White Limbo, dir. Cara Holmes

Irish Council for Civil Liberties Human Rights Film Award:
Special Mention: Street Leagues, dir. Daniel F. Holmes
Winner: Herself, dir. Phyllida Lloyd

Lifetime Contribution Award: Liam Cunningham, actor

Fantastic Flix Jury Awards, as chosen by The Ark's Children's Jury:
Feature Film: OnwardShort Film: Streets of Fury, dir. Aidan McAteer

Dublin Film Critics' Circle Awards:
Best Film: Supernova
Best Actor: Albano Jeronimo (The Domain)
Best Actress: Barbara Sukowa (Deux)
Best Screenplay: Congcong Teng (Send Me to the Clouds)
Best Director: Roy Andersson (About Endlessness)
Best Cinematography: Leonardo Simões (Vitalina Varela)
Best Ensemble: Rocks
Best Irish Film: ArrachtGeorge Byrne Maverick Award: Pat Murphy
Best Documentary: New York Our TimeMichael Dwyer Discovery Award: Clare Dunne
Jury Prizes: Moffie; Marona's Fantastic Tale; Deerskin; If You Are Happy2021
The 2021 festival took place during 3–14 March.

Dublin Film Critics' Circle Awards:
Best Film: Apples
Best Actor: Goran Bogdan (Father)
Best Actress: Joanna Scanlan (After Love)
Best Screenplay: Lee Isaac Chung (Minari)
Best Director: Lili Horvát (Preparations to be Together for an Unknown Period of Time)
Best Cinematography: Viktor Kossakovsky/Egil Håskjold Larsen (Gunda)
Best Irish Film: Tadhg O'Sullivan (To The Moon)
George Byrne Maverick Award: Ivan Kavanagh
Best Documentary: Acasă, My Home
Michael Dwyer Discovery Award: Zofia Stafiej (I Never Cry)
Jury Prizes:
 Kyle Gallner, actor in Dinner in America Noah Hutton, writer-director of Lapsis Zoé Wittock, director of Jumbo Bryan Fogel, director-producer of The Dissident2022
The 2022 festival took place from 23 February to 6 March.

Best Director: Laura Samani, Small BodyBest Screenplay: Terence Davies, BenedictionBest Actress: Anamaria Vartolomei, HappeningBest Actor: Udo Kier, Swan SongBest Debut Feature: Blerta Basholli, HiveBest Editor: Sean Baker, Red RocketBest Cinematography: Frédéric Noirhomme, PlaygroundBest Ensemble: Róise & FrankBest Documentary: MaisieBest Irish Documentary: VickySpecial Jury Prize: Cannon Arm and the Arcade QuestGeorge Byrne Maverick Award: Tristan Heanue (Harvest – short)
Michael Dwyer Discovery Award: Kelly Campbell (An Encounter'' – short)

2023
The 2023 festival will take place from 23 February to 4 March.

See also 
 Cinema of Ireland
 Cineworld Dublin
 Screen Cinema
 Savoy Cinema
 Irish Film Institute

References

External links 
 Official site
 Dublin International Film Festival at the Internet Movie Database
 Jameson Dublin International Film Festival at Film Festival World
 Dublin International Film Festival in brief and visitors' information

Recurring events established in 2003
Film festivals in Ireland
Culture in Dublin (city)
2003 establishments in Ireland
Film festivals established in 2003